Remind (previously Remind101) is a private mobile messaging platform that aims to help teachers, parents, students, and administrators in K–12 schools to communicate with everyone at once. The platform has more than 20 million monthly active users across the United States. As of September 2016, Remind is used in more than 50% of the public schools in the U.S.

Background
Remind101 was founded in 2011 by brothers Brett and David Kopf to help bridge the communication gap in primary education. In 2016, they added former Bleacher Report CEO Brian Grey to the team as CEO.

Brett Kopf was diagnosed with attention deficit disorder and dyslexia while still in school. His brother David set up a system whereby school faculty could remind him of an upcoming test. Brett credits this system with playing a part in his success in school. The two decided to make the system into a company and became part of the first class at the Imagine K12 incubator in Palo Alto, CA, where all startups must focus on improving education.

On June 16, 2014, Kopf announced that Remind101 would be changing its name simply to Remind.

Educational impact
The platform is designed to increase parental engagement which has been linked to increased student performance. One study showed that teacher-to-family communication increased homework in general by 42%, kept students more focused, and increased participation.

Funding
In September 2013, Remind closed a $3.5 million round of Series A financing, led by The Social+Capital Partnership, with participation from Yuri Milner, Maneesh Arora and other angel investors. As part of the round, Chamath Palihapitiya joined Remind's board of directors.

In February 2014, Remind raised $15 million in Series B funding led by Kleiner Perkins Caufield & Byers with additional participation from its previous investors, including Social + Capital and First Round Capital. In coordination with the round, the company added John Doerr, a venture capitalist at Kleiner Perkins, to its board.

In September 2014, Remind raised $40 million in Series C funding from its previous investors.

References 

2011 establishments in the United States
Educational technology companies of the United States
Mobile technology companies
American companies established in 2011